Satbankura is a village and a gram panchayat in the Garhbeta III CD block in the Medinipur Sadar subdivision of the Paschim Medinipur district  in the state of West Bengal, India. The headquarters of this block are located here.

Geography

Location

Area overview
Paschim Medinipur district (before separation of Jhargram) had a total forest area of 1,700 km2, accounting for 14.31% of the total forested area of the state. It is obvious from the map of the Midnapore Sadar subdivision, placed alongside, is that there are large stretches of forests in the subdivision. The soil is predominantly lateritic. Around 30% of the population of the district resides in this subdivision. 13.95% of the population lives in urban areas and 86.05% lives in the rural areas.

Note: The map alongside presents some of the notable locations in the subdivision. All places marked in the map are linked in the larger full screen map.

Demographics
According to per 2011 Census of India Satbankura had a total population of 3,118 of which 1,574 (50%) were males and 1,544 (50%) were females. Population in the age range 0–6 years was 398. The total number of literate persons in Satbankura was 1,857 (59.56% of the population over 6 years).

.*For language details see Garhbeta III#Language and religion

Civic administration

CD block HQ
The headquarters of Garhbeta III block are located at Satbankura.

Transport
NH 14, (old numbering NH 60), running from Morgram to Kharagpur, passes through Satbankura.

Education
Gourav Guin Memorial College was established at Chandrakona Road, PO Satbankura in 2008. Affiliated with Vidyasagar University, it offers honours courses in Bengal, English and history and a general course in arts.

References

Villages in Paschim Medinipur district